The 1868 Plymouth by-election was fought on 21 December 1868.  The by-election was fought due to the incumbent Liberal MP, Sir Robert Porrett Collier, becoming Attorney General for England and Wales.  It was retained by Collier who was unopposed.

References

1868 in England
Elections in Plymouth, Devon
1868 elections in the United Kingdom
By-elections to the Parliament of the United Kingdom in Devon constituencies
19th century in Plymouth, Devon
Unopposed ministerial by-elections to the Parliament of the United Kingdom in English constituencies
December 1868 events